The 2020–21 EFL Trophy, known as the Leasing.com Trophy before 28 October 2020 and later the Papa John's Trophy for sponsorship reasons, was the 38th season in the history of the competition, a knock-out tournament for English football clubs in League One and League Two of the English football system, and also including 16 Premier League and Championship "Academy teams" with Category One status.

Salford City were the defending champions; however, the 2020 final was delayed due to the COVID-19 pandemic until the day prior to the 2021 final. Hence, for most of the tournament, Portsmouth (who won the 2019 final and were also in the 2020 final) were the most recent champions.

Sunderland won the trophy for the first time after beating Tranmere Rovers 1–0 in the final.

Participating clubs
48 clubs from League One and League Two.
16 invited Category One Academy teams.
Expelled clubs were automatically eliminated from the tournament.
Category One teams relegated to League One missed out on having academies participate in the following tournament.

Four Premier League clubs with Category One academies did not participate: Burnley and Crystal Palace, both in their first full season of Category One status, and Everton and Tottenham Hotspur, who both played in the previous year's competition but declined to participate in this one. A fifth Premier League club's academy, Sheffield United, did not have Category One status. As a result, the academy of Championship-side Norwich City was invited instead.

Eligibility criteria for players
For EFL clubs
Minimum of four qualifying outfield players in their starting XI. A qualifying outfield player was one who met any of the following requirements:
Any player who started the previous or following first-team fixture.
Any player who was in the top 10 players at the club who had made the most starting appearances in league and domestic cup competitions that season.
Any player with forty or more first-team appearances in their career.
Any player on loan from a Premier League club or any EFL Category One Academy club.
A club could play any eligible goalkeeper in the competition.

Competition format
Group stage
 Sixteen groups of four teams were organised on a regionalised basis.
 All groups included one invited club.
 All clubs played each other once, either home or away (Academies played all group matches away from home).
 Clubs were awarded three points for a win and one point for a draw.
 In the event of a drawn game (after 90 minutes), a penalty shoot-out was held with the winning team earning an additional point.
 Clubs expelled from the EFL were knocked out of the tournament automatically.
 The top two teams progressed to the knockout stage.

Knockout stage
 Round 2 and 3 of the competition were drawn on a regionalised basis.
 In Round 2, the group winners were seeded and the group runners-up were unseeded in the draw.
 In Round 2, teams who played in the same group as each other in the group stage were kept apart from each other.

Group stage

Northern Section

Group A

Group B

Group C

Group D

Group E

Group F

Group G

Group H

Southern Section

Group A

Group B

Group C

Group D

Group E

Group F

Group G

Group H

Round 2

Northern section

Southern section

Round 3

Northern section

Southern section

Quarter-finals

Semi-finals

Final

References

EFL Trophy
2020–21 European domestic association football cups
2020–21 English Football League